Illarion or Ilarion is a Russian first name, a transliteration of the Greek name "".  It is shared by the following individuals:

Illarion Ivanov-Schitz (1865–1937), Russian/Soviet architect
Illarion Mgeladze (1890–1941, a.k.a. Ilya Vardin), Georgian Marxist revolutionary writer
Illarion Pryanishnikov (1840–1894), Russian painter
Illarion Vasilchikov (1805–1862), Imperial Russian general
Count Illarion Ivanovich Vorontsov-Dashkov (1837–1916), Russian politician

See also

Ilarion (name)
Hilario (name)
Hilarion (name)
Hilary (name)

Russian given names